The 2012 season was Chonburi's 7th season consecutive season in the top division of Thai football. Chonburi will also be competing in the 2012 AFC Cup after losing the qualifying play-off for the 2012 AFC Champions League.

Players

First team squad
As of July 20, 2012

             Note: The official club website lists the supporters as player 12th man.

Competitions

Premier League

League table

Matches

FA Cup

|colspan="3" style="background-color:#99CCCC"|1 August 2012

League Cup

First round

|colspan="3" style="background-color:#99CCCC"|9 June 2012

Second round

|colspan="3" style="background-color:#99CCCC"|11 July 2012

Third round

|colspan="3" style="background-color:#99CCCC"|22 August 2012

Quarter-finals

|colspan="5" style="background-color:#99CCCC"| 1st leg on 5 September 2012 & 2nd leg on 12 September 2012

AFC Champions League

AFC Cup

Knockout stage

Quarter-finals

Chonburi won 5–4 on aggregate.

References

2012
Chonburi